Paran Jai Jaliya Re (My Heart is Set on Fire) is a 2009 Bengali romance film directed by Ravi Kinnagi. This film stars Dev and Subhashree Ganguly. It is a remake of 2007 Hindi film Namastey London. The director of the original Vipul Shah filed a case against the producers of Paran Jai Jaliya Re and they gave a penalty of Rs. 75 lakh. In this movie, Dev and Subhashree Ganguly act together in the second time after the film, Challenge.

Plot
Anna (Subhashree Ganguly) is a NRI girl living in London whose father (Biswajit Chakraborty) wants her to get married with an Indian lad. However, Anna is deeply involved in a platonic relationship with a half-British boy Harry. Anna's brother, Sid (Tota Roy Choudhury) is in a relationship with a British girl and wants to marry her. However, his father refuses to let him marry her and which makes Sid choose to leave his parents' home. Meanwhile, Anna's father manages to bring his wife and daughter to India where he can find a suitable groom for his daughter. They meet Raj, a quintessential charming Bengali lad who falls in love with Anna and their marriage is finalized since Raj's father is an old friend of Anna's dad. However, although Anna likes Raj, she hatches a plan to delay and finally annul the engagement by implementing her brother's plan of bringing Raj to London and 'breaking up' with him abroad. Now in a foreign land, Raj tackles the adversities before him in order to win over Anna and marry her at last.

Cast
Dev as Raj
Subhashree Ganguly as Anna
Rahul Banerjee as Vivek (Guest Appearance)
Tota Roy Chowdhury as Siddharth "Sid" Banerjee
 Maryam as Liza, Siddharth's wife
Biswajit Chakraborty as Ranjit Bannerjee, Anna's father
Labony Sarkar as Maya Banerjee, Anna's mother
Aritra Dutta Banik as Raj's Cousin
Bodhisttva Majumdar as Bijay, Raj's father
Mousumi Saha as Raj's Mother
 Locket Chatterjee as Seema, Raj's aunt
 Rajat Ganguly as Ranjit's friend
 Mita Chatterjee as Raj's grandmother
 Shaan as Harry

Soundtrack

The biggest hit was "Chokher Jole" sung by Zubeen Garg.

Controversy
The producers of the movie were sued for plagiarism soon after the release of the film by Vipul Shah who produced Namastey London who alleged that the plot was his film.  The film was banned from screening twice, once by a lower court and later by Calcutta High Court. After the High Court decision, the producers came to a settlement after Shree Venkatesh Films agreed to pay a fine of seventy-five lakh (7.5 million) rupees. This out-of-court settlement can be considered hefty since the making of the film took about 2 crore (20 million) rupees. Moreover, the settlement required the movie to display a title card stating 'Based on Namastey London, a film by Vipul Amrutlal Shah'.

References

External links

2009 films
Bengali-language Indian films
Bengali remakes of Hindi films
2000s Bengali-language films
Indian romantic comedy-drama films
Films scored by Jeet Ganguly
Indian drama films